Abdellatif Baka (born 7 May 1994) is a visually impaired Algerian middle-distance runner. Competing in the T13 classification, Baka represented his country  at the 2012 Summer Paralympics in London where he won the gold medal in the 800 metres race, and the 2016 Summer Paralympics in Rio de Janeiro, winning the 1500 metres. He won the 1500m in Rio with a record 3'48.29, a faster time than that of the 2016 Summer Olympics 1500m winner, Matthew Centrowitz Jr. The latter's time in the Rio Olympics men's 1500 meters final race was beaten not only by all three medalists in the Rio Paralympics men's 1500 meters race but also by Fouad Baka, who is the brother of Abdellatif Baka and came 4th in that final race. He is also a multiple World Championships winner, taking four medals over two tournaments.

See also
 World and Paralympic records set at the 2016 Summer Paralympics

References

External links 
 

1994 births
Living people
Algerian male middle-distance runners
Paralympic athletes of Algeria
Athletes (track and field) at the 2012 Summer Paralympics
Athletes (track and field) at the 2016 Summer Paralympics
Paralympic gold medalists for Algeria
Medalists at the 2012 Summer Paralympics
Medalists at the 2016 Summer Paralympics
Paralympic medalists in athletics (track and field)
Athletes (track and field) at the 2020 Summer Paralympics
21st-century Algerian people
20th-century Algerian people